Joe Rau (born 17 March 1991) is an American wrestler who specializes in Greco-Roman wrestling.

High School Career
Rau wrestled for St. Patrick High School (Chicago), but never placed in the state tournament. He was an Illinois state qualifier, two-time conference champion and freestyle state champion.

College career
At Elmhurst College Rau was coached by past NCAA champion Steve Marianetti and won the 184 pound title at the 2013 NCAA Division III Wrestling Championships. He is a three-time NCAA DIII All-American and 2014 University Nationals Champion. Rau was named Conference Wrestler of the Year, Elmhurst College Athlete of the Year and became two-time place winner at Midlands Championships.

Senior career
Joe Rau is a two-time Senior World Team Member (2014, 2019), and two-time U.S. Open champion (2016, 2019).

In 2021, he placed fifth in several international tournaments in Europe: Grand Prix of Zagreb Open in Croatia, the Olympic Preparation Tournament in Hungary and the ranking tournament Matteo Pellicone in Italy.

In 2020, Rau won gold at the Pan-American Championships and the Pan-American Olympic Qualifier. In doing so, effectively secured the Olympic spot for Team USA at 87 kg for the 2020 Olympics in Tokyo, Japan.

In 2019, he became Final X champion after scoring on Ben Provisor in the last seconds of the last finals match. Rau won the U.S. Open and came third at the Dave Schultz Memorial International. He placed fourth at the same tournament in Freestyle.

In 2018, Rau earned gold at the Lavrikov Championships in Russia and the Bill Farrell Memorial International in Freestyle. In Greco-Roman he took third at the Bill Farrell Memorial International. He placed second in the Haparanda Cup in Sweden and the U.S. Open. He came in fourth at the World Team Trials Challenge Tournament in Freestyle.

In 2017, after failing to qualify for the World Team in Greco-Roman, he earned a spot in the freestyle trials by way of a last chance qualifier. Rau became runner-up in the U.S. World Team Trials and U.S. Open.

In 2016, he won Olympic Team Trials, U.S. Open. He took silver at the Grand Prix of Zagreb Open and bronze at Pan-American Games Qualifier. He took ninth at the Second World Olympic Games Qualifier.

In 2015, Rau won the Pan-American Championships as well as a host of other domestic and international tournaments: Senior Nationals & Trials Qualifier, Bill Farrell International Tournament and the Grand Prix Zagreb Open. Additionally he took second at the Dave Schultz Memorial International, third at the Grand Prix of Spain and the Hungarian Grand Prix. He came in fourth in the U.S. Open.

In 2014, Rau became Phase II World Team Trials champion. He competed at the 2014 World Wrestling Championships at 80 kg.  He lost in the first round to Jonas Bossert of Switzerland by fall. He won gold at the University Nationals Championships and Northern Plains Regional Championships.

In 2013, he became the runner-up at the New York AC International Tournament and took fourth place in the U.S. Open.

In 2012, Rau came in third at the Canada Cup in Freestyle.

References 

Living people
American male sport wrestlers
1991 births
Pan American Wrestling Championships medalists
20th-century American people
21st-century American people